A Brighter Beat may refer to:

 A Brighter Beat (album), an album by Malcolm Middleton
 "A Brighter Beat" (song), a song by Malcolm Middleton